B14 may refer to:

Transportation 
 B14 (New York City bus)
 HLA-B14, an HLA - B serotype
 London Buses route B14
 Bundesstraße 14, federal highway in Germany
 Martin XB-14, a variant of the Martin B-10 bomber
 The generation of Nissan Sentra built from 1995 to 1999
 Volvo B14A engine
 Chery V5, a Chinese car, also known as Chery B14
 B14 (dinghy), the class of sailing dinghy designed by Julian Bethwaite
 LNER Class B14, a class of 5 British steam locomotives

Other uses 
 Caro-Kann Defence, Encyclopaedia of Chess Openings code
 B14-0,-5 and -7, a series of model rocket engines produced by Estes Industries from approximately 1968-1979
 Boron-14 (B-14 or 14B), an isotope of boron